Omni is an American post-punk band from Atlanta. The band is a duo consisting of Philip Frobos on vocals and bass and Frankie Broyles on guitar, drums, and keyboard. Broyles was previously a member of Deerhunter. Their sound is influenced by post-punk bands like Television, Talking Heads, and Wire, with "mathematical" rhythms and "wiry guitar chords, nervy basslines, and jolting beats."

The band's first album, Deluxe, was released in 2016 on Trouble in Mind Records to positive reviews. Their second album, Multi-task, followed in 2017 and received positive reviews as well, including a 7.6 rating from Pitchfork.

In 2019, Omni signed to Sub Pop, and released their third album, Networker, later that year. This album was also appreciated by critics. In his review, Chris Ingalls at PopMatters wrote that the band had "managed to pull off the difficult trick of dragging an older, established subgenre into the current musical climate skillfully and effectively." Drew Schwartz from Vice called them "the best post-punk band in America".

Discography
Deluxe (2016, Trouble in Mind)
Multi-task (2017, Trouble in Mind)
Networker (2019, Sub Pop)

References

Musical groups from Atlanta
Sub Pop artists
Musical groups established in 2011
2011 establishments in Georgia (U.S. state)